Pleurodema bibroni is a species of frog in the family Leptodactylidae. Its common name is four-eyed frog, although this name can also refer to the genus Pleurodema in general.
The common name refers to two inguinal poison glands that resemble eyes.  When threatened, the frog lowers its head and raises its rear.  When the frog adopts this posture the poison glands are also raised toward the predator.  The predator may also confuse the frog's raised posterior for the head of a larger animal.

Pleurodema bibroni is found in Uruguay and southern Brazil. Its natural habitats are coastal sand plains, open savannas, rocky outcrops, grasslands and open montane habitats between 0 and 900 meters above sea level. Breeding takes place in temporary pools. It is a rare species that occurs in widely scattered populations. It is threatened by habitat loss caused by encroaching agriculture, human settlements, and pine plantations.

It is suspected that the urbanization of some coastal areas is responsible in part for the decline of the species.

References

Pleurodema
Amphibians of Brazil
Amphibians of Uruguay
Taxonomy articles created by Polbot
Amphibians described in 1838